Delong is either a surname of French origin or a masculine given name of Chinese origin. DeLong and De Long are variants of the surname of French origin. Notable people with the names include:

Surname 
 Alana DeLong, Canadian politician
 Allison DeLong (born 1940), Canadian politician
 Candice DeLong (born 1950), American criminologist
 Delmar DeLong (1931–1999), American politician
 Elizabeth DeLong, American bio-statistician
 Gary DeLong, American soccer player
 George B. De Long (?–1924), American real estate businessman assassinated in Albania
 George W. De Long (1844–1881), American naval officer and arctic explorer
 J. Bradford DeLong (born 1960), American economist
 Jesse Delong (1805–1868), Canadian politician
 Joe DeLong (born 1972), American politician
 Keith DeLong (born 1967), American football player
 Mahlon DeLong, American neurologist
 Michael P. DeLong (1945–2018), American Marine general
 Phillip C. DeLong (1919–2006), American Marine officer
 Richard DeLong, American singer
 Russell V. DeLong (1901–1981), American minister and college president
 Sidney Randolph DeLong (1875–1914), American politician
 Solomon DeLong (1849–1925), Pennsylvania Dutch writer and journalist
 Sophie Delong (born 1957), French politician
 Steve DeLong (1943–2010), American football player
 Robert C. DeLong (1922-1997), American Veteran and Businessman

Given name 

 Ding Delong (1904–1996), Chinese military officer
 Jia Delong (born 1985), Chinese baseball player
 Xu Delong (1952–2018), Chinese materials scientist

Other uses 
 Delong, Indiana
 DeLong, Pleasants County, West Virginia
 DeLong Star Ruby
 

Surnames
Given names

Surnames of French origin
French-language surnames
Chinese masculine given names